2018 Júbilo Iwata season.

Squad
As of 16 January 2018.

Out on loan

J1 League

References

External links
 J.League official site

Júbilo Iwata
Júbilo Iwata seasons